Amira (also spelled Emira or Ameera) Amirah  (Arabic: أميرة) (Hindi: अमीरा) (Hebrew: אֲמִירָה ) is an Arabic female given name, meaning "princess ", a Hindi name meaning “princess” or “high born girl,” (derived from Arabic)  and a Hebrew female given name, meaning 'treetop' or 'saying'.

Variant forms include: Emira, Ameera, Ameerah, Amirah, and Meera.

Usage 
The name sees usage mainly in North Africa, West Asia, South Asia and Southeast Asia.

First name / given name
 Amira Aisya, Malaysian politician
 Amira Ben Amor, Tunisian long-distance runner
 Amira Ben Chaabane, Tunisian sabre fencer
 Amira Bennison, aka Kate Bennison, British historian of the Middle East,
 Amira Casar, French actress
 Amira Dotan, Israeli military figure, politician, former member of Knesset
 Amira Edrahi, Libyan swimmer
 Amira El Fadil (born 15 January, 1967), Sudanese government official
 Amira Griselda Gómez, Mexican politician 
 Amira Hass, Israeli journalist and author
 Amira Hess, Iraqi-born Israeli poet and artist
 Amirah Inglis (1926-2015), Australian communist and writer
 Amira Medunjanin, female singer from Bosnia and Herzegovina
 Amira Nowaira, Egyptian academic, translator, columnist and author
 Amira Rasheed, American singer
 Amira Sartani, Israeli politician, former member of Knesset
 Amira Selim, Egyptian soprano and opera singer
 Amira Willighagen, Dutch singer
 Amira Yoma (born 1952), Argentina political advisor and restaurateur
 Amirah Vann, American actress
 Ameera al-Taweel, Saudi Arabian princess
 Ameerah Haq, Bangladeshi diplomat

Fictional characters
 Amira Masood, also Shah, fictional character from the BBC soap opera EastEnders
 Emira Blight, fictional character from American Disney animated television series The Owl House

Middle name
Khalil Amira El-Maghrabi, Egyptian boxer

Surname
Efraim Amira, Israeli football (soccer) player
Ibn Amira, or Ahmad ibn Abd Allah Ibn Amira, the 12th-century historian, poet, and scholar of law from al-Andalus during the reign of the Almohad dynasty

See also
Amirah
Amira (disambiguation)

References

Arabic feminine given names
Bosnian feminine given names
Hebrew feminine given names